Radio Višegrad or Радио Вишеград is a Bosnian local public radio station, broadcasting from Višegrad, Bosnia and Herzegovina.

It was launched on 7 April 1992 as local/municipal radio station. Radio station broadcasts a variety of programs such as local news, music, sport and talk shows.

Program is mainly produced in Serbian language, from 09:00 to 18:00, except Sunday.

Estimated number of potential listeners of Radio Višegrad is around 9.645. Radiostation is also available in municipalities of Podrinje area and in neighboring Serbia.

Frequencies
 Višegrad

See also 
List of radio stations in Bosnia and Herzegovina
Radio Goražde

References

External links 
 www.fmscan.org
 opstinavisegrad.com
 Communications Regulatory Agency of Bosnia and Herzegovina

Višegrad
Radio stations established in 1992
Višegrad